The 1913 Fitzgibbon Cup was the second staging of the Fitzgibbon Cup since its establishment by the Gaelic Athletic Association in 1912. University College Galway hosted the cup from 11 April to 13 April 1913.

University College Dublin were the defending champions.

On 13 April 1913, University College Cork won the Fitzgibbon Cup after topping the group with four points after recording two wins. University College Dublin were runners-up.

Statistics

Group table

Group results

References

Fitzgibbon
Fitzgibbon Cup